Thomas Elsdon Ashford (1859 – 21 February 1913) was an English recipient of the Victoria Cross, the highest and most prestigious award for gallantry in the face of the enemy that can be awarded to British and Commonwealth forces.

Early life
He was born in 1859 at 2 Peck's Cottage, All Saints, Newmarket, Suffolk, the illegitimate son of Thomas Ashford, a boot maker and Emma Elsdon. Thomas joined the Army at Woolwich for the 49th Brigade on 12 June 1877.

The VC action
He was about 21 years old, and a private in The Royal Fusiliers, British Army during the Second Anglo-Afghan War when the following deed took place for which he was awarded the VC.

On 16 August 1880 at Deh Khoja, near Kandahar, Afghanistan, Private Ashford assisted Lieutenant William St. Lucien Chase in rescuing and carrying for a distance of over 200 yards under the fire of the enemy, a wounded soldier who had taken shelter in a block-house and finally brought the wounded man to a place of safety. His citation read:

After his military service, Ashford settled in Thringstone, Leicestershire and served as a postman for many years. He was married in Thringstone Church to Betsy Ann Sisson on 29 January 1891. He later moved to the neighbouring village of Whitwick and died on 13 February 1913. He was laid to rest in Whitwick Cemetery, in the presence of thousands of mourners, though the grave lay unmarked for many years, until a monument was provided by the local British Legion. Three streets in Whitwick have since been named in his honour.

The Medal
His Victoria Cross is displayed at the Royal Fusiliers Museum in the Tower of London.

References

 Royal Fusiliers Recipients of the Victoria Cross
 "Elegant Extracts" - The Royal Fusiliers Recipients of the VC (J.P. Kelleher, 2001)
Monuments to Courage (David Harvey, 1999)
The Register of the Victoria Cross (This England, 1997)

External links
Leicestershire's first VC
Burial location of Thomas Ashford "Leicestershire"
Location of Thomas Ashord's Victoria Cross "Royal Fusiliers Museum, London"

British recipients of the Victoria Cross
Royal Fusiliers soldiers
1859 births
1913 deaths
Burials in Leicestershire
People from Newmarket, Suffolk
Second Anglo-Afghan War recipients of the Victoria Cross
Deaths from bronchitis
British Army recipients of the Victoria Cross
People from Thringstone
People from Whitwick
Military personnel from Suffolk